The following is a list of colleges and universities in the U.S. state of Oklahoma.

Four-year institutions

Tribal colleges
 Cheyenne-Arapaho Tribal College  – Weatherford, Oklahoma - closed 2015
 College of the Muscogee Nation – Okmulgee, Oklahoma
 Comanche Nation College – Lawton, Oklahoma - closed 2017
 Pawnee Nation College  – Pawnee, Oklahoma

Two-year institutions
 Carl Albert State College – Poteau, Oklahoma
 Connors State College – Warner, Oklahoma
 Eastern Oklahoma State College – Wilburton, Oklahoma
 Murray State College – Tishomingo, Oklahoma
 Northeastern Oklahoma A&M College – Miami, Oklahoma
 Northern Oklahoma College – Tonkawa, Oklahoma
 Oklahoma City Community College – Oklahoma City, Oklahoma
 Oklahoma State University - Oklahoma City – Oklahoma City, Oklahoma
 Redlands Community College – El Reno, Oklahoma
 Rose State College – Midwest City, Oklahoma
 Seminole State College – Seminole, Oklahoma
 Tulsa Community College – Tulsa, Oklahoma
 Western Oklahoma State College – Altus, Oklahoma

Defunct colleges and universities

See also

 List of college athletic programs in Oklahoma
List of school districts in Oklahoma
List of private schools in Oklahoma
List of CareerTech centers in Oklahoma
 Higher education in the United States
 List of American institutions of higher education
 List of recognized higher education accreditation organizations
List of colleges and universities
List of colleges and universities by country

Notes

External links
Department of Education listing of accredited institutions in Oklahoma
Oklahoma State Regents for Higher Education

 
Oklahoma
Universities and colleges